Roy is a 2015 Indian Hindi-language romantic drama film directed by debutant Vikramjit Singh and produced by Bhushan Kumar, Krishan Kumar, Divya Khosla Kumar and Ajay Kapoor under Freeway Pictures. The movie features Arjun Rampal and Jacqueline Fernandez in the lead roles and Shernaz Patel, Rajit Kapur and Shibani Dandekar in supporting roles. Ranbir Kapoor does an extended cameo appearance. Anupam Kher appears in a cameo. The film is based on a filmmaker writing and directing movies about thefts and robberies. The movie had its premiere in Dubai on 12 February 2015 and was released worldwide on 13 February 2015 to negative reviews.

Plot
Kabir Garewal (Arjun Rampal), a casanova film maker and screenwriter, is making multiple films (GUNS Trilogy) based on a thief's life and robberies. The first two films have been highly successful. In order to shoot the third part of the trilogy, he goes to Malaysia, where he meets a London-based film maker Ayesha (Jacqueline Fernandez). Kabir and Ayesha get friendly and soon fall in love. When Ayesha finds out about Kabir's casanova past and believes him to be unchanged, she breaks up with him and returns to London. Dejected, Kabir goes into depression and returns to Mumbai, leaving his film incomplete. After several attempts, Kabir is unable to find the perfect climax for his film. On his assistant Meera's (Shernaz Patel) suggestion, Kabir attends a film festival as part of the jury, where Ayesha's film is being screened. Ayesha thinks Kabir is stalking her and asks him to stay away from her. After his father's (Anupam Kher) death followed by him being sued by his film's financiers, Kabir decides to move on and complete his film.

In the parallel story of imaginary characters in Kabir's film Guns 3, an infamous Roy (Ranbir Kapoor) is a mysterious international art thief whom no country seems to be able to get their hands on, including Detective Wadia (Rajit Kapur). On his new assignment, Roy goes to an unknown foreign land to steal an expensive painting only to find that its owner is the beautiful Tia (also played by Jacqueline Fernandez). Tia lives alone in a huge mansion where the painting is kept. So, Roy tries to befriend Tia during an art auction and soon impresses her with his charm. Sparks fly between them and both start spending time together, giving Roy entry into the mansion. Finding the right opportunity one night, Roy runs away with the painting, leaving Tia heartbroken. Roy later regrets this, as he realises he has fallen for Tia and decides to return the painting to her. After a small clash with the painting's new owner, Roy manages to get it back. On receiving the painting, Tia realises that Roy is now a changed man and forgives him.

Meanwhile, Kabir's film Guns 3 is released and is hugely successful at the box office. In the end, Kabir proposes to Ayesha and they reunite, just like Roy and Tia in Kabir's film. The movie ends with Roy and Tia walking together over a bridge, similar to the one in the stolen painting.

Cast
Arjun Rampal as Kabir Grewal, a famous film maker and screenwriter who tries to find Roy's true purpose and Ayesha's love interest.
Jacqueline Fernandez as Ayesha Aamir, a film director and Kabir's love interest / Tia Desai (imaginary character in Kabir’s story & love interest of Roy)
Ranbir Kapoor as Roy, a mysterious art thief whom no one has gotten their hands on (a character in Kabir's film later revealed in climax & imaginary character in real life and Tia's love interest) (Extended cameo appearance)
 Abhijeet Singh as Raj, a Master cop
Shernaz Patel as Meera Pandit
Anupam Kher as Mr. Grewal (cameo), Kabir's father who later dies
Rajit Kapur as Detective D. S. Wadia 
Asif Basra as Abra Rizvi, an Art Dealer 
Shibani Dandekar as Zoya
Barun Chanda as Roy's boss
Kaizaad Kotwal as Navrose Irani
Cyrus Brocha as a Talk-show host
Mandana Karimi as Pia (cameo), Kabir's girlfriend

Production

Promotions and marketing
The trailer of the film was released on 17 December 2014 and passed over 1 million views on YouTube within 24 hours. The film was promoted at famous reality shows like Bigg Boss and Comedy Nights with Kapil.

Critical reception
The film received highly negative reviews from critics. Rajeev Masand on ibnlive gave it only one star, saying "The film limps lethargically and collapses in a predictable twist ending." Rahul Desai and Aasir Tavawalla were even inspired to create a campaign called "Aakraman on Roy" to get their money back from the filmmakers. Taran Adarsh gave it 0 out of 5 called it a disastrous outing.

Soundtrack

The songs of Roy are composed by Ankit Tiwari, Meet Bros Anjjan and Amaal Mallik, "Sooraj Dooba Hai" and "Tu Hai Ki Nahi Whistle" become Hit in 2015.While the lyrics are written by Kumaar, Sandeep Nath and Abhendra Kumar Upadhyay. The music rights for the film were acquired by T-Series. Sanjoy Chowdhury composed the film score.

Release
The first single, "Sooraj Dooba Hain", sung by Arijit Singh, Aditi Singh Sharma and composed by Amaal Mallik, was released on 22 December 2014. The complete album was released digitally on 9 January 2015. An additional Remix EP was released on 27 January 2015.

Track listing

Reception
The songs of Roy received positive response from critics but the film received negative reviews from the critics and audiences as well, criticising film’s story, screenplay, direction & slow narration, but praised the performances (especially Rampal’s and Kapoor’s), cinematography, locations & film’s dramatic score. Rediff awarded the album with 4 out of 5 stars and called it "a winner all the way". Koimoi published, "After a really long time, here is an album that has songs which are truly worth listening peacefully on your phones. This album will surely make its way to your playlist and most songs are worth playing on loop."

Box office
The film grossed  worldwide.

Awards

Notes

References

External links
 

2015 films
Indian romantic drama films
Indian romantic thriller films
2015 romantic drama films
2010s romantic thriller films
Films shot in Malaysia
Films about screenwriters
Films scored by Ankit Tiwari
T-Series (company) films
Films scored by Meet Bros Anjjan
Films scored by Sanjoy Chowdhury
2015 directorial debut films